Pilidiostigma glabrum, the plum myrtle,  is a small tree or shrub native to the rainforests of eastern Australia. Commonly seen in disturbed sites from near Port Macquarie in the south to Fraser Island in the north. 

Leaves and floral parts are hairless. Leaves opposite on the stem, 2 to 10 cm long, 1 to 3 cm wide, oil glands, very small. A narrow leaf form is found near Crystal Creek, in northern New South Wales. Small branches coloured purple/brown.

White or pink flowers grow relatively large, 2 cm across, appearing from April to November. Fruit are a purplish black pear shaped berry, up to 13 mm in diameter, with four to eight kidney shaped seeds. Seeds germinate easily from 7 to 28 days. Cuttings are slow to strike roots.

References

Flora of New South Wales
Myrtaceae
Myrtales of Australia
Taxa named by Max Burret